Farm to Market Roads in Texas are owned and maintained by the Texas Department of Transportation (TxDOT).

FM 1

Farm to Market Road 1 (FM 1) was the first farm-to-market road to be designated in Texas, at the request of local industry for a paved road.  The  road provides access to rural areas of East Texas from US 96.

FM 2

Farm to Market Road 2 (FM 2) is located in Grimes County.

It travels along the northeastern edge of the Texas Department of Criminal Justice's O.L. Luther Unit and crosses SH 6. It continues east, passing several prison farms, before ending at FM 362.

FM 2 was designated on July 29, 1941, from Courtney east to SH 6.

, TxDOT plans to convert the at-grade intersection with SH 6, regarded as dangerous, into a diamond interchange.

FM 3

Farm to Market Road 3 (FM 3) is located in southwestern Leon County. FM 3 was designated in March 1942.

FM 3 passes through the town of Normangee, intersecting with FM Spur 3 and other roads. The route briefly travels to the west, through rural farmland, providing access to Normangee City Park. It then turns more northward, passing the unincorporated community of Hilltop Lakes, before intersecting . FM 3 passes through a long stretch of farmland, before reaching its northern terminus at US 79.

FM 3 was designated on March 26, 1942, from Normangee westward to Normangee City Park, as a replacement for SH 265. The route was lengthened to the northwest, first on August 25, 1949, to FM 977, and then on August 1, 1970, to its present western terminus at US 79; this extension replaced part of FM 977. The spur connection was designated on November 26, 1969.

FM 4

Farm to Market Road 4 (FM 4) runs from Grandview north and west to Jacksboro.

FM 5

Farm to Market Road 5 (FM 5) is located in Parker County.

It briefly travels to the south before turning west and entering Annetta South. The route then turns to the north and passes through Annetta and Annetta North. Throughout Annetta South and Annetta, FM 5 travels through a highly residential area. FM 5 ends at the eastbound frontage road of I-20 at its exit 415 in Willow Park.

FM 5 was designated on March 26, 1942, from Aledo due north to US 80, replacing . On December 10, 1946, it was extended south and west  to a road intersection at Annetta. On June 28, 1963, it was extended north to Willow Park, replacing  and essentially creating a loop route.

FM 6

Farm to Market Road 6 (FM 6) is located in Collin and Hunt counties.

The road begins at an intersection with SH 78 just north of Lavon. From there, it goes east, passing through Nevada and Josephine. The eastern terminus is at SH 66 in Caddo Mills.

FM 7
Farm to Market Road 7 (FM 7) was a designation applied to two separate highways. No highway currently uses the FM 7 designation.

FM 7 (1942–1949)

FM 7 was originally designated on March 26, 1942, as a highway from Lipan to US 281 as a replacement for Spur 108. On June 5, 1945, the road was extended southeast to Granbury. FM 7 was cancelled on October 23, 1949, and became a portion of FM 4.

FM 7 (1951–1961)

The next use of the FM 7 designation was in Dallas and Rockwall counties, from Garland to Rockwall over a former routing of US 67. On June 16, 1957, the road was extended east over old US 67 to Royse City. FM 7 was cancelled on November 30, 1961, and was redesignated as part of SH 66, which also replaced more of old US 67.

FM 8

Farm to Market Road 8 (FM 8) is located in Eastland and Erath counties.

The route was designated on March 26, 1942, from Lingleville east to Stephenville, replacing SH 68. On July 19, 1945, the route was extended westward to the Eastland county line. On December 21, 1945, FM 8 was extended further westward to the end of FM 96 in Desdemona. On May 17, 1948, the route was extended further westward, reaching Gorman, which was the original endpoint of SH 68, replacing FM 96. The highway was extended west  on May 26, 1957. The highway was extended east on May 6, 1964, from SH 108 to US 281. The highway was extended west to its current terminus on October 26, 1983, over the previous routing of SH 6.

FM 9

Farm to Market Road 9 (FM 9) is located in Panola and Harrison counties.

FM 9 begins at an intersection with US 79 in the unincorporated community of Panola. The route travels north into Waskom, where it crosses I-20; access from I-20 is provided via exit 633 (eastbound) and 635 (westbound). The route has a brief concurrency with US 80 before turning back toward the north. FM 9 straddles the east side of the Longhorn Army Ammunition Plant before ending near the south shore of Caddo Lake.

The current FM 9 was designated on May 23, 1951. The original route was the segment from US 79 to FM 451 near Elysian Fields. On July 11, 1968, the highway was extended north to FM 1999 and FM 2457. On August 5, 1968, FM 2457 was combined, extending FM 9 to its current terminus.

FM 9 (1942)

A previous FM 9 was formed from Midland south  on March 26, 1942, when the route was designated from part of SH 137. On August 3, 1943, that route was redesignated as part of SH 349. This was the first Farm to Market Road to be cancelled. That routing has no connection to the current designation.

FM 10

Farm to Market Road 10 (FM 10) is located in Panola County.

The road begins at an intersection with FM 999 in Gary City. From there, it goes north to Daniels. Just north of Daniels, there is a brief concurrency with FM 2517. After, it continues north towards the northern terminus at Business US 79 in Carthage.

FM 10 was designated on May 23, 1951, on its current route.

FM 10 (1942)

The original FM 10 was designated on March 26, 1942, from San Augustine to a point on SH 63 near Zavalla as a replacement of SH 147. FM 10 was cancelled on September 9, 1947, and changed back to SH 147.

FM 11

Farm to Market Road 11 (FM 11) is located in Ward, Crane, and Pecos counties. The  road begins at SH 18 in Grandfalls and passes through Imperial and Girvin before terminating at I-10 in Bakersfield.

The road was designated in 1942 between Grandfalls and Imperial and has been incrementally lengthened over the years incorporating a former route of  FM 847 before the road was completed in 1975. The road crosses US 67 and US 385 in Girvin.

RM 12

Ranch to Market Road 12 (RM 12) is located in Hays and Travis counties.

The southern terminus of RM 12 is in San Marcos at I-35 exit 202. From there, it proceeds along Wonder World Drive along the far west edge of San Marcos. RM 12 continues west from San Marcos to intersect with RM 32 (at "The Junction") and then heads north to Wimberley. RM 12 then continues through Woodcreek to Dripping Springs, where it crosses US 290. From there, it continues north through the community of Fitzhugh to its terminus at RM 3238 (Hamilton Pool Road), approximately six miles west of Bee Cave.

RM 12 was formed from the segment of SH 80 from San Marcos to Wimberley on March 26, 1942. On May 31, 1945, it was extended north to Dripping Springs. On December 19, 1963, it was extended again, from Loop 82 to I-35. On June 2, 1967, it was extended north  to a road intersection. On May 30, 1987, it was extended north to RM 3238 and a county road.

A planned expansion of RM 12 between Dripping Springs and Wimberley to a four- and five-lane divided highway was defeated as part of a county bond election in 2007.

Following the opening of San Marcos' Wonder World Drive extension project, state and local officials re-designated Wonder World Drive, previously designated Farm to Market Road 3407, as part of RM 12, moving the southern terminus to SH 123. The original portion of RM 12 through San Marcos was re-designated as an extension of SH 80 on the state highway system on June 24, 2010.

FM 13

Farm to Market Road 13 (FM 13) is a  road, located in Smith, Cherokee. and Rusk counties, that begins at  SH 135 in Troup and travels eastward with a major intersection at  SH 42 in Price before terminating at Business US 79 and  Bus. SH 64 in Henderson. The road also passes through the town of Henry's Chapel.

FM 13 begins in Troup at SH 135 in Smith County. The road proceeds along E. Duval Street and then turns south along S. Price Street. The road then turns to the southeast along the edge of town before  FM 1089 branches off to the west near the Cherokee County line. The route continues to the southeast to Henry's Chapel where  FM 856 branches to the south. The road then goes to the northeast and enters Rusk County before crossing SH 42 in Price. The road then proceeds eastward toward Henderson and intersects  Loop 571 west of town. The road enters Henderson following W. Main St. until it terminates at Bus. US 79-F and Bus. SH 64-E.

The road encounters terrain of gentle relief for its entire length.

FM 13 was designated as State Highway 324 between Henderson and Carlisle on October 30, 1939. The town of Carlisle was renamed Price the following year. The highway was re-designated FM 13 on March 26, 1942. A second, discontinuous segment of the road was designated on June 11, 1945, between Troup and the Cherokee-Rusk county line west of Price, and the uniting segment from that county line to Price was designated on February 20, 1946.

FM 14

Farm to Market Road 14 (FM 14) is a  road, located in Smith and Wood counties. It begins at Loop 323 in Tyler and travels northward with a major intersection at  I-20 near Shady Grove before terminating at  SH 154 south of Winnsboro. The road also passes through the town of Hawkins. The road was designated in 1942 and is a state highway.

FM 14 begins in Tyler at State Loop 323 in Smith County. The road proceeds along State Park Highway through Shady Grove (where it intersects Interstate 20) and Red Springs, where it turns to the northeast. The road then turns to the north, crossing into Wood County and passing through Hawkins, where it intersects US 80. It continues north through the towns of Pine Mills and Oak Grove to the northern terminus at SH 154.

FM 14 was designated as SH 270 between Tyler and Sand Flat on June 21, 1938. The highway was re-designated FM 14 on March 26, 1942. The road was extended to SH 154 on June 11, 1945, and to the current northern terminus on July 14, 1949. On May 31, 1966, the portion from Spur 147 to  US 271 became an extension of Spur 147. The road was rerouted east to US 271 on September 27, 1971. The portion from Loop 323 to US 271 was redesignated Urban Road 14 (UR 14) on June 27, 1995. The designation reverted to FM 14 with the elimination of the Urban Road system on November 15, 2018.

FM 15

Farm to Market Road 15 (FM 15) is a  road, located in Smith County, that begins at  SH 135 in Troup and travels eastward to the terminus at  SH 64 in Wright City. The road also passes through the community of Salem. The road was designated on March 26, 1942, and used to be State Highway 269.

FM 15 begins in Troup at State Highway 135. The road proceeds along E. Bryant Street until the city limits of Troup. The road travels five miles to the west before it turns to the north. Near Salem, it turns westward towards the terminus at State Highway 64 in Wright City.

FM 15 was designated as State Highway 269 between Troup and Wright City on June 21, 1938. The highway was re-designated FM 15 on March 26, 1942.

FM 16

Farm to Market Road 16 (FM 16) is located in Van Zandt and Smith counties.

The road begins at an intersection with SH 64 just west of Colfax. From there, it goes east through Colfax and Van, intersecting I-20 at an interchange. From Van, the road continues east along SH 110 passing through the towns of Garden Valley, Hideaway, Lindale, Red Springs, and Winona, where it has a brief concurrency with SH 155. From Winona, the road continues east to the eastern terminus at US 271.

FM 16 was formed on March 26, 1942, from Colfax to Van, replacing a part of SH 243. The road was extended to the current western terminus just west of Colfax and eastward to Lindale on June 11, 1945, creating a concurrency with SH 110. The road was extended east to Winona on February 14, 1947, and extended to its current length on October 29, 1948.

FM 17

Farm to Market Road 17 (FM 17) is located in Van Zandt and Wood counties.

The road begins at an intersection with SH 64 near Canton. From there, it goes northeast, intersecting I-20 at an interchange. The road continues on to SH 110 in Grand Saline, Texas. The road then follows SH 110 to US 80. The road follows US 80 before heading northeast and north to  FM 515. The road follows FM 515 east and then heads north and east to SH 154 in Yantis.

FM 17 was formed on March 26, 1942, from Grand Saline to Alba, replacing a part of SH 110. The road was extended southwest  on January 11, 1945. On June 11 of that year, the road was extended southwest to Canton, its current southern terminus. The road was extended to Yantis on December 17, 1947. The road was extended along old US 69 in Alba on October 26, 1954. On October 31, 1957, the road was extended east  from Yantis. On October 11, 1961, the section from Yantis east  was transferred to  FM 2225. This section of FM 2225 became part of FM 2966 on October 6, 1980, due to construction of Lake Fork Reservoir, which caused some parts of FM 2225 to be inundated and also resulted in FM 17 being relocated along FM 515 over Lake Fork Reservoir, as the old route was inundated (part is now part of FM 514 and FM 514 spur).

FM 18

Farm to Market Road 18 (FM 18) is located in Taylor and Callahan counties.

FM 18 begins at an intersection with SH 36 in Abilene near Abilene Regional Airport. The highway leaves the city limits and enters Callahan County at Elmdale Road. The highway runs east and enters Clyde near FM 1707. FM 18 has an interchange with FM 604 before running through town on South 1st Street before turning at a nearly 90 degree angle onto Stephens Street. The highway makes another turn at FM 258 before leaving the town. FM 18 runs east to Baird where it ends at an intersection with BL I-20.

The current route was designated on September 19, 1951, from a segment of US 80. The section from SH 36 to Elmdale Community was redesignated Urban Road 18 (UR 18) on June 27, 1995. The designation reverted to FM 18 with the elimination of the Urban Road system on November 15, 2018.

RM 18 (1942)

RM 18 was formed on March 26, 1942, from part of SH 208 from Colorado City, Texas south . On April 29, 1942, another section was added from Robert Lee, Texas north  to the county road to Sanco. On November 18, 1944, the gap between  miles north of Robert Lee and  miles south of Colorado City was filled. This route was cancelled on April 23, 1947, when it became an extension of SH 208.

FM 19

Farm to Market Road 19 (FM 19) is located in Anderson County. The road is 13.4 miles (21.5 km) long.

The road begins at an intersection with SH 155 in Frankston. From there, it goes south to Neches, via Todd City. The southern terminus is at FM 2574.

FM 19 was designated on April 29, 1942, as a route between Neches and Todd City. It was extended north to Frankston on May 19 of that year. On October 24, 1944, the portion from Todd City to Frankston was canceled due to the extension of SH 155 to Palestine. On December 17, 1952, FM 19 was extended back from Todd City to Frankston, completing its current route. The original section from had been designated as SH 272 on June 21, 1938, while it was being built. When the route was built some time after September 26, 1939, SH 272 was cancelled, meaning the road was already built at the time FM 19 was designated.

FM 20

Farm to Market Road 20 (FM 20) is located in Bastrop, Caldwell, and Guadalupe counties.

The road begins at an intersection with SH 71 just west of Bastrop. From there, it goes southwest, passing through Red Rock. At Lockhart, it becomes concurrent with US 183 for a 0.1-mile segment, then turns off to the west on State Park Road. It continues southwest, passing through Fentress, until its southern terminus at SH 123 just north of Seguin.

FM 20 was designated on April 29, 1942, from Bastrop southwestward to Lockhart (this was part of SH 21 before 1939). On April 18, 1958, it extended southwest to FM 621, replacing FM 964. Six days later, it extended southwest to just north of Seguin, replacing a section of FM 621. However, the signs did not change until the 1959 Texas Travel Map was released to the public; On October 31, 1958, around the time the signs were changed, the current FM 964 was designated.

FM 21

Farm to Market Road 21 (FM 21) is located in Franklin, Titus, and Camp counties.

FM 21 begins at an intersection with SH 11. It then proceeds through a relatively empty, farming area of Camp County. The bridge that crosses Lake Bob Sandlin is approximately a half a mile long (0.8 km). After crossing the lake, FM 21 passes Lake Bob Sandlin State Park. The road then passes through the unincorporated community of Blodgett. After this, FM 21 passes through a long stretch of open farmland before passing through Hopewell and continues to its northern terminus of SH 37.

FM 21 was designated on April 29, 1942, as a  road traveling from SH 11 to around Lake Bob Sandlin State Park. Later that day, another segment from created from SH 37 through Hopewell to Macon (erroneously shown as FM 28 on one administration order), creating a gap in the route. The gap was filled on June 11, 1945.

FM 22

Farm to Market Road 22 (FM 22) is located in north-central Cherokee County.

The western terminus of FM 22 is at an intersection with US 69 in Craft. The route travels east through Turney and Gallatin, where it is known as 1st Avenue and has a brief concurrency with FM 768. FM 22 continues eastward and ends at an intersection with SH 110 south of the community of Ponta.

FM 22 was commissioned on April 29, 1942, along the current route. This addition was removed from the state highway system on March 1, 1972, in exchange for the creation of FM 3198.

FM 23

Farm to Market Road 23 (FM 23) is located in Cherokee County.

FM 23 begins at an intersection with SH 294. It travels through empty agricultural areas of Cherokee County, and serves as both endpoints for FM 1857. FM 23 passes Russell Cemetery outside of Rusk. It crosses FM 343 as it enters Rusk. FM 23 travels through the city before ending at an intersection with Loop 62 and FM 752.

FM 23 was designated on April 29, 1942, along its current route.

FM 24

Farm to Market Road 24 (FM 24) is located in Nueces County. It is locally known as Violet Road. The highway's southern terminus is at SH 44 in Violet. It runs north into Corpus Christi, passing several churches, and the small Violet Park, before intersecting Spur 407. It continues to its northern terminus at exit 11B of I-37.

FM 24 was designated on May 23, 1951, from SH 44 to Spur 407 (then SH 9). It was extended to its current length on September 5, 1973.

FM 24 (1942)

A previous route numbered FM 24 was designated in Coleman County on April 29, 1942, from Coleman west to the New Central School. The entire route was then cancelled on June 22, 1944, and transferred to FM 53 (now SH 153).

FM 25

Farm to Market Road 25 (FM 25) was located in Comal and Guadalupe counties. No highway currently uses the FM 25 designation.

FM 25 was designated on April 29, 1942, from US 81 (now Business I-35) near New Braunfels to US 90 near Seguin. On June 9, 1966, the section from US 90 north to I-10 was redesignated as Spur 351. On February 26, 1968, the section from I-35 northwest  was transferred to SH 46 and Loop 337. The remainder of FM 25 was cancelled on September 28, 1988, and transferred to SH 46. Spur 351, which by then had been extended south to SH 123, became part of SH 46 on May 14, 1990.

FM 26

Farm to Market Road 26 (FM 26) is located in Martin and Dawson counties.

The southern terminus of FM 26 is at FM 846 in Martin County. It runs northwest, intersecting FM 2212 in the community of Brown, before turning west. The route turns to the northwest again at its intersection with FM 3263. FM 26 is briefly concurrent FM 2002 before splitting off and entering Dawson County. Continuing to the northwest, FM 26 crosses FM 828 in Sparenburg before reaching its northern terminus at US 87.

FM 26 was extended south  on November 20, 1951, and to FM 1742 on March 26, 1953, adding another . On April 9, 1953, FM 1742 was cancelled and combined with FM 26.

FM 27

Farm to Market Road 27 (FM 27) is located in Freestone and Limestone counties.

The western terminus of FM 27 is at SH 171. In Wortham, FM 27 passes Wortham High School before passing through downtown. It runs concurrently with FM 80 just south of Kirvin. FM 27 then enters Fairfield and reaches its eastern terminus at US 84.

This was SH 210 before 1939.

FM 28

Farm to Market Road 28 (FM 28) is located in Crosby and Floyd counties.

FM 28's southern terminus is at an intersection with US 82/SH 114. From there, FM 28 heads north, then east, then north again. Turning to the northwest, it passes through Dougherty before turning to the north again to an intersection with US 62/US 70. FM 28 runs concurrently with these highways for about  before again heading north, reaching its northern terminus at County Roads 200 and 303.

FM 28 was designated in Floyd County on June 23, 1942, from US 70 to Dougherty. On October 26, 1954, FM 28 was extended south to FM 1472 (its current junction with FM 193). On November 1, 1954, FM 28 was extended to its current southern terminus, and FM 1472 was cancelled. On March 24, 1958, FM 28 was extended  northward to its current northern terminus, as FM 2265 was cancelled and combined.

FM 29
Farm to Market Road 29 (FM 29) was a designation applied to two separate highways. No highway currently uses the FM 29 designation.

FM 29 (1942–1949)

FM 29 was designated on April 29, 1942, along a road in Grimes County from SH 90 near Singleton to Iola. On January 27, 1949, FM 29 was extended north to North Zulch. On May 20, 1949, the designation was cancelled, with the road becoming an extension of FM 39.

FM 29 (1951–1967)

The FM 29 designation was later applied to a road in Val Verde County, beginning at US 90 (later Loop 406, now Spur 406) northwest of Devils River and heading northeast to Lake Walk. FM 29 was cancelled on October 27, 1967, because the roadway was to be inundated by Amistad Reservoir. As a result, the road was permanently closed.

FM 30

Farm to Market Road 30 (FM 30) is located in Uvalde County.

FM 30 (1942)

The original Farm to Market Road 30, designated on April 29, 1942, ran from Memphis east to a connection with US 83 in Childress County. FM 30 was cancelled on January 7, 1948, and became part of SH 256.

FM 31

Farm to Market Road 31 (FM 31) is located in Harrison and Panola counties. The highway begins at US 59 (Future I-369) in Marshall, turning southeast while intersecting I-20 outside the city limits. In the community of Crossroads, FM 2625 passes through while FM 2199 ends completely, all while FM 31 continues southeastward. In the town of Elysian Fields, FM 451 ends as FM 31 heads into Panola County. The highway intersects US 79 in De Berry. The road has a small concurrency with FM 123 in Carthage. Further south, FM 2517 makes a four-way intersection there, where a few miles to the east FM 3359 is formed. The highway ends at the Texas-Louisiana state line, where it becomes LA 765.

FM 31 was designated on April 29, 1942, from US 59 in Marshall to Elysian Fields. On June 11, 1945, it was extended southward to the Panola County Line. Seven days later, it was extended south to De Berry. On November 20, 1951, it was extended south to what was then FM 998. On January 7, 1952, FM 31 was extended southward to the Louisiana State Line, replacing a section of FM 123 (which was rerouted over FM 998 instead).

RM 32

Ranch to Market Road 32 (RM 32) is located in Blanco, Comal, and Hays counties. The road begins at US 281 south of Blanco, and continues east as it enters Comal County. In Fischer, FM 3424 ends there, and upon entering Hays County, the highway ends at an intersection with RM 12 in Wimberley.

RM 32 was designated as State Highway 232 between SH 80 in Wimberley and US 281 on August 1, 1936. SH 80 was truncated and the western terminus became RM 12 on March 26, 1942; at the same time, SH 232 was to be redesignated as an RM road once the counties agreed to do so, which happened by April 29, 1942, when RM 32 was designated, replacing SH 232.

RM 33

Ranch to Market Road 33 (RM 33) is located in Howard, Glasscock, and Reagan counties.

RM 33 was designated on April 29, 1942, from US 87 south of Big Spring south  to the Glasscock County line. On February 11, 1944, the designation was extended south to Garden City. On June 11, 1945, the route was extended south to Big Lake, and was redesignated Farm to Market Road 33 (FM 33). On October 29, 1948, FM 33 was extended south and east to SH 163. On July 14, 1949, it was extended east to Eldorado, replacing FM 865. The designation reverted to RM 33 on October 1, 1956. By 1966, the section from RM 1980 (now US 190) to Eldorado was signed, but not designated, as SH 29, and by 1969, the section from RM 1800 south to RM 1980 was signed, but not designated, as SH 137. On June 30, 1977, the section from Eldorado west to RM 1980 (along with RM 1980 itself) was transferred to US 190. On May 16, 1984, the section of RM 33 from SH 137 south to US 190 officially became part of SH 137.

Junction list

FM 34

Farm to Market Road 34 (FM 34) is located in Hudspeth County.

The road proceeds north for  before ending at I-10 exit 87.

FM 34 was designated on April 29, 1942, along the current route.

FM 35

Farm to Market Road 35 (FM 35) is located in Rockwall and Hunt counties. The road begins at I-30 in Royse City and runs to SH 276.

FM 35 was designated on April 29, 1942, from Quinlan to Mexico. On November 23, 1948, the section from Union Valley to Quinlan was added, creating a concurrency with SH 34. On November 30, 1949, the road was extended east  to Sabine River Bottom. On December 17, 1952, the road was extended west  to the Rockwall County line. On February 26, 1953, the road was extended west to the new location of US 67 (now I-30), replacing FM 1396. On October 26, 1954, the road was extended east to the Rains County Line. On November 29, 1954, the road was extended east to US 69 (now FM 2795) at Emory, replacing FM 2102 and creating a concurrency with FM 47. On April 1, 1959, the Union Valley-Quinlan section was revised to end at Loop 264 instead of SH 34 (a  section of FM 35 was transferred to Loop 264). On December 15, 1959, the concurrency with FM 47 was removed. On October 15, 1970, the section of FM 35 from Loop 264 west  miles was transferred to SH 276. On October 25, 1990, a  section of FM 35 from SH 34 east to US 69 was also transferred to SH 276.

Junction list

FM 36

Farm to Market Road 36 (FM 36) is located in Hunt County. The road begins at SH 276 west of Quinlan and ends at FM 1562. There are concurrencies with US 380 and SH 66.

FM 36 was designated on April 29, 1942, from SH 24 (now US 380) west of Floyd to Merit. On September 12, 1946, the section from SH 24 at Floyd south to US 67 (now SH 66) at or near Caddo Mills was added, creating a concurrency with SH 24. On November 30, 1949, the road was extended southeast  from Caddo Mills. On October 28, 1953, the road was extended north to FM 1562. On October 26, 1954, the road was extended south to FM 35 (now SH 276). On June 24, 2010, the section of FM 36 from US 380 to BU 380-J was removed from the state highway system. FM 36 was instead realigned over the new US 380.

Junction list
{{jcttop
|state=TX
|county=Hunt
|length_ref=<ref>{{google maps|url=Google Maps/33.3026318,-96.2677543/@33.0984105,-96.2719019,11.25z/data=!4m8!4m7!1m0!1m3!2m2!1d-96.2284434!2d33.0642209!1m0!3e0|title=Route of FM 36|access-date=January 14, 2018|link=no}}</ref>
}}

FM 37

Farm to Market Road 37 (FM 37) is located in Bailey, Lamb, Hale, and Floyd counties. The road begins at SH 214 south of Enochs, and heads eastward to FM 54. Later, on a different end of FM 54, it meets the Bailey County line, and heads northeast to Amherst with FM 1072. At another point with FM 1072, it heads eastward to FM 168 at Hart Camp. It then crosses US 87 in Cotton Center, and performs an analogous operation (being concurrent to a highway and then ending the concurrency) on its way to FM 400, and from there to FM 789, and from there to FM 378, and finally eastward to US 62 in Floydada, where the highway ends.

When the highway was created on April 29, 1942, it ran from a junction with US 84 to Amherst. On March 18, 1944, the highway was expanded to include a strip from Amherst to SH 51. On December 16, 1948, it extended east  to what is now FM 1072. On September 19, 1968, the highway was expanded to its present length, replacing several routes: FM 2189 from SH 214 to FM 54; FM 1928 from FM 54 to US 84; a section of FM 1072 from FM 1072 to FM 168 (FM 1072 was rerouted to the north, replacing part of FM 1842); FM 1315 from FM 168 to FM 400; and FM 579 from FM 400 to US 62. Part of the road numbered FM 1315 had been designated as FM 2063.

FM 38

Farm to Market Road 38 (FM 38) is located in Lamar and Delta counties. The road begins at US 82 west of Petty and turns north and east to Maxey, then southeast through Brookston and Roxton to Ben Franklin.

FM 38 was designated on April 29, 1942, from US 82 west of Brookston through Roxton to Noble, with the section from US 82 to Roxton replacing SH 188. On April 30, 1945, the Roxton-Noble section was cancelled and became part of FM 137. FM 38 was expanded to include a section from the Lamar County line to FM 128 at Ben Franklin on June 9, 1947, creating a gap in the highway. This gap was closed on February 27, 1948, when FM 38 was extended from Roxton to Ben Franklin. On August 23, 1948, FM 38 was again extended north over the old location of US 82 to the new location of US 82. On February 1, 1949, the road was extended northwest to Maxey, replacing FM 907. The final change came on August 25, 1949, when FM 38 was extended to US 82 west of Petty, bringing the highway to its final length.

FM 39

Farm to Market Road 39 (FM 39) is located in Limestone, Leon, Madison, and Grimes counties. The road begins at SH 14 south of Mexia, and turns south, intersecting SH 164 before FM 80 ends directly parallel to the Freestone County line. However, no part of the road's mileage is in Freestone County, as the road turns south to Leon County shortly afterward. The highway then intersects with US 79 in Jewett and then intersects with SH 7 in the community of Concord. As the highway turns directly south, it makes an intersection with FM 977 in Flynn. In Normangee, it makes an intersection with the Old San Antonio Road, where it enters Madison County, and has a concurrency with FM 1452 in the community of George. The highway subsequently makes an intersection with a concurrent SH 21/US 190 in North Zulch. As it enters Grimes County, the road bypasses Iola, and ends at SH 90 north of Singleton.

When it was designated on April 29, 1942, the road considered of the section from Normangee to Flynn. On August 3, 1943, the road was expanded to include a segment from Mexia to Personville, creating a gap in the highway. The road's southern portion was expanded on February 28, 1945, to include US 190 at North Zulch, and the northern strip received a segment from Personville to Jewett. On April 18, 1947, the southern strip was expanded again to Robbins. The highway was extended from Jewett to Robbins on December 16, 1948, closing the gap. On May 20, 1949, FM 39 was extended south through Iola to Singleton, replacing FM 29. On June 21, 1982, the highway was slightly modified to go via Tyler Street instead of McKinney Street in Mexia, giving it its present-day length.

FM 40

Farm to Market Road 40 (FM 40) is located in Lubbock and Crosby counties. It runs from FM 1729 to FM 651. There are concurrencies with FM 378 and SH 207.

FM 40 was designated on April 29, 1942, from US 62 and US 82 at Lubbock to Acuff. On December 29, 1949, the road was extended east to FM 378, replacing FM 1526. On March 24, 1958, the road was extended to FM 651, replacing FM 1309 and FM 1308 and creating concurrencies with FM 122 (now SH 207) and FM 378. On June 27, 1995, the section from US 62 to FM 1729 was redesignated Urban Road 40 (UR 40). The designation of this section reverted to FM 40 with the elimination of the Urban Road system on November 15, 2018.

FM 41

Farm to Market Road 41 (FM 41) is located in Hockley and Lubbock counties. The road begins from FM 303 southeast of Sundown and turns about 48 miles eastward bypassing Ropesville and Slide before eventually returning to Bus. US 84 in Slaton. Originally, the route went from a junction of US 87 south of Lubbock to Slide. On June 25, 1945, the highway extended east to  miles west of Slaton and west from Slide to the Hockley County line. On December 17, 1952, FM 41 was extended west to SH 51 (now US 385). On February 24, 1953, the road was extended west to FM 300 (now FM 303), replacing FM 1174. US 84) were added, and the highway reached its present length.

RM 42

Farm to Market Road 42 (FM 42) and Ranch to Market Road 42 (RM 42) were designations applied to a highway in Menard and McCulloch counties. No highway currently uses the FM 42 or RM 42 designations.

On January 18, 1946, the road was shortened  to end at Davis School. On November 23, 1948, FM 42 was extended west  to a point  miles north of Calf Creek. On July 21, 1949, the road was extended west to US 83, replacing FM 379. On October 1, 1956, the route's designation was changed to RM 42. RM 42 was cancelled on June 30, 1977, and became part of US 190 as that route was extended westward from Brady.

FM 43

Farm to Market Road 43 (FM 43) is located in Nueces County. The highway runs from SH 358 southwest and west to FM 665.

FM 43 was designated on May 23, 1951, from SH 286 through London School to FM 665. On June 1, 1965, the road was extended east and northeast to SH 357. On July 11, 1968, FM 43 was extended northeast to SH 358. On June 27, 1995, the section from SH 358 to SH 357 was redesignated Urban Road 43 (UR 43). The designation of this section reverted to FM 43 with the elimination of the Urban Road system on November 15, 2018.

Junction list

FM 43/RM 43 (1942)

The original FM 43 was formed on April 29, 1942, from US 83 near Menard through Mission San Saba to an existing roadway north of the San Saba River as a replacement of a portion of SH 151. On June 11, 1945, FM 43 was redesignated Ranch to Market Road 43 (RM 43) and a section from Eldorado to the Menard County Line was designated, creating a gap. On June 20, 1945, the gap was closed. RM 43 was cancelled on March 17, 1948, and reassigned back to SH 151 (now SH 29).

FM 44

Farm to Market Road 44 (FM 44) is located in Red River and Bowie counties. The highway runs from FM 114 south, east, and southeast to FM 561.

FM 44 was designated on April 29, 1942, from US 82 near Annona south  to Boxelder, On May 19, 1942, it replaced Spur 23 from US 82 to Annona (this section was formerly SH 180 and later SH 5 Spur). On December 18, 1951, it extended  southeastward to a road intersection. On November 21, 1956, it extended to FM 561 and FM 911 in Lydia. On February 13, 1958, it extended east over a section of FM 561 to what was then FM 1996 (which became part of FM 561 that day) west of Siloam. On October 31, 1958, FM 44 was extended north to FM 114.

FM 45

Farm to Market Road 45 (FM 45) runs from US 190 in Richland Springs north to US 377 about 5 miles south of Brownwood. FM 45 forms a portion of the partial beltway that goes around the southeast side of Brownwood (the rest is formed by FM 2126).

FM 45 starts at US 190 about 14.7 miles west of San Saba and heads northbound through Richland Springs to Main Ave. where the road briefly turns east for one block before continuing northbound. After exiting Richland Springs, FM 45 traverses the rural landscape with a daytime speed limit of 70 MPH. Halfway to Brownwood, FM 45 crosses the Colorado River from San Saba County into Brown County. At its junction with FM 2126, FM 45 continues west to US 377 with a speed limit of 65 MPH.

FM 45 provides Brownwood with a direct link to Richland Springs and San Saba (and vice versa). The highway shortens the trip between Brownwood and Richland Springs from 54 miles (going through Brady) to 34 miles.

Before Farm to Market Roads were built, one of the first bridges across the Colorado River in this area is the Regency Bridge. A historical marker was erected by the Texas Department of Transportation at the junction of FM 45 and FM 574 that describes the bridge.

FM 45 was designated on April 29, 1942, from US 190 north  to the Locker Road. On July 13, 1945, it was extended north  to a road intersection. On November 23, 1948, it was extended north  to near the Colorado River. On January 22, 1953, FM 45 was extended north to the Mills County Line. On February 6, 1953, FM 45 was extended north and west to US 377, replacing FM 1474. On October 29, 1954, it was extended south from the old location of US 190 to the new location of US 190.

FM 46

Farm to Market Road 46 (FM 46) is located in Falls and Robertson counties. It runs from SH 6 west of Bremond to SH OSR in Wheelock.

FM 46 was designated on April 29, 1942, from SH OSR northward  to 1 mile north of Wheelock, replacing part of SH 255. On November 20, 1951, FM 46 was extended north to US 79 in Franklin. On May 15, 1954, FM 46 was extended to SH 14 in Bremond (the original endpoint of SH 255), replacing FM 392. On September 26, 1967, FM 46 was extended north to new location SH 6 over old location SH 6. On August 31, 1971, FM 46 was rerouted over part of FM 2293, removing the break at SH 14 and completing its current route.

FM 47

Farm to Market Road 47 (FM 47) is located in Rains and Van Zandt counties. It runs from SH 198 to US 69 in Point.

FM 47 was designated on April 29, 1942, from US 80 in Wills Point north  to Clifton. On January 11, 1945, FM 47 was extended south to Scott. On June 11, 1945, FM 47 was extended south to SH 243. On October 29, 1948, FM 47 was extended south to SH 198. On May 23, 1951, FM 47 was extended northeast . On October 29, 1953, FM 47 was extended north to US 69, replacing a portion of FM 514. In 1975, FM 47 was realigned (the old route is now Rains County Road 1430)

FM 48

Farm to Market Road 48 (FM 48) is located in Hemphill and Wheeler counties. It runs from SH 152 in Mobeetie (also called Old Mobeetie) to FM 1268.

FM 48 was designated on April 29, 1942, from SH 152 north  to New Mobeetie. On May 19, 1942, it extended south  to Mobeetie, replacing Spur 41. On November 23, 1948, FM 48 was extended eastward . On May 26, 1949, FM 48 was extended north and west  to a road intersection, and the old route was changed to a spur connection. On August 7, 1951, the spur connection was transferred to FM 1046. On December 17, 1952, FM 48 was extended north to FM 1268.

The closing scene of the 2000 film Cast Away was filmed at the intersection of FM 48 and FM 1268.

FM 49

Farm to Market Road 49 (FM 49) is located in Wood and Upshur counties. It runs from US 69 in Mineola, northeast and then east via Hainesville and Pine Mills, to SH 154 on the western edge of Gilmer.

It was extended to Hainesville on June 11, 1945, and to an intersection with FM 14 in Pine Mills on December 17, 1947. It was extended to former FM 554 on November 14, 1959. FM 554 was cancelled on August 3, 1971, with the section from FM 49 to SH 154 was transferred to FM 49.

FM 50

Farm to Market Road 50 (FM 50) is a  route, beginning at SH 105 near Brenham and passing to the north through Independence to US 79 and US 190 near Hearne. The road has a brief concurrency with  SH 21 along a bridge crossing the Brazos River. The road is in Washington, Burleson, Brazos, and Robertson counties.

The road was designated on April 29, 1942, along the portion of the present route north of SH 21. On May 20, 1942, the road was extended through Snook to SH 36 at Lyons, replacing a portion of SH 230 (of which the remainder became part of the then-new FM 60). On August 24, 1943, FM 50 was extended south to SH 211 in Independence. On October 6, 1943, FM 50 was extended south to SH 90, replacing most of SH 211. The remainder of SH 211 became Spur 197, and is now FM 390 and FM 390 Spur. The section of FM 50 from east of Snook to SH 36 was transferred to FM 60.

FM 51

Farm to Market Road 51 (FM 51) runs from US 67 in Somervell County north and east to I-35 in Gainesville. Skirting the northwestern fringes of the Dallas-Fort Worth Metroplex, it is available as a more scenic and less-congested shortcut between I-20 west of Weatherford and I-35 north of Gainesville.

This route north of Decatur was designated as SH 169 in 1932, but extended to Weatherford and became part of an extended SH 89 until 1939. FM 51 was designated on April 29, 1942, from Gainesville to Era. On May 19 of that year, three more sections were added: one from Decatur northeast  to the Slidell Road, one from SH 114 to Springtown, and one from Weatherford north . On June 5, 1945, another section was added from the Parker-Hood county line to Granbury. Seven days later, FM 51 was extended from Weatherford to the Parker-Hood county line, connecting the sections. On February 14, 1947, it was extended from SH 114 to Decatur, closing another gap. On April 28, 1949, it extended from the Denton/Wise county line to Era, closing the last gap. On September 28 in that year, it was extended east from the old location of US 77 to the new location of US 77; two other sections of old US 77 was replaced by FM 1306 and FM 1307. On August 24, 1955, it was extended southwest to FM 201 (now FM 56). On November 23, 1959, it was extended east from US 77 along the old location of US 82 to US 82. On December 20, 1984, when the district combined several farm to market roads with others, FM 51 was extended southwest to US 67, replacing FM 204. In the same order, FM 56 replaced FM 201. Part of the road designated FM 204 was designated as FM 2223.

FM 52

Farm to Market Road 52 (FM 52) is located in Parker and Palo Pinto counties. It runs from SH 254 north to Oran, east to Whitt, and south to FM 1885.

FM 52 was designated on May 20, 1942, from Oran east across US 281 to Whitt. On December 2, 1953, FM 52 was extended south from Oran to SH 254. On August 24, 1955, FM 52 was extended southeast from Whitt to FM 1885.

FM 53

Farm to Market Road 53 (FM 53) was located in Coleman, Runnels, Taylor, and Nolan counties. No highway currently uses the FM 53 designation.

FM 53 was designated on May 20, 1942, from SH 70,  miles south of Sweetwater, southeast to SH 158 (now US 277). On June 22, 1944, FM 53 was extended east to Crews, replacing FM 70. Another section of FM 53 was added from Coleman to the New Central School, replacing FM 24. This created a gap in the route. On October 29, 1948, the western section was extended east to the Runnels/Coleman County Line. On November 2, 1948, the eastern section was extended northwest to Glen Cove. On September 21, 1965, it was relocated in Winters, removing a concurrency with US 83; the old route became Loop 438. On December 1, 1969, it was extended east over the old location of US 84 to the new location of US 84, creating a concurrency with SH 206. FM 53 was cancelled on May 16, 1988, and transferred to SH 153.

FM 54

Farm to Market Road 54 (FM 54) is located in Bailey, Lamb, Hale, and Floyd counties. The road begins at the Texas-New Mexico state line where NM 321 ends, and continues east to Enochs whilst making an intersection with SH 214. The highway turns north and for a short stretch is merged with FM 37. After leaving Bula and entering the Lamb County line, the highway makes an intersection with US 84 in Littlefield. While the highway is still in the city limits, it also makes intersections with US 385 and Boulevard 430. After exiting the city limits, the highway makes an intersection with FM 1072, and performs this same action again when it intersects FM 168 in Spade. Soon after it passes the Hale County line, FM 179 becomes conterminous with FM 54, but exits the highway shortly afterward. The highway then crosses I-27 and US 87, which are both conterminous. The highway then intersects FM 400 and turns northeast in Petersburg due to FM 789 slanting there shortly before entering Floyd County. Shortly thereafter, the highway ends at a conterminous stretch of SH 207 and US 62 south of Floydada.

FM 54 was formed on May 20, 1942, from a junction with US 87 north of Abernathy to Petersburg as a restoration of part of SH 278. On May 18, 1944, the highway was expanded to include a section from Spade via Littlefield to the Bailey county line. This created a gap. On June 4, 1945, another section was added from SH 207 to the Floyd-Hale county line. This created another gap. On June 16 of that year, one section extended west from the Lamb-Bailey county line to SH 214. On July 9 of that year, one section was extended west from US 87 to the Hale-Lamb county line. On June 4, 1946, it was extended from the Floyd-Hale county line to Petersburg, closing one gap. On January 22, 1947, a spur connection was added in Petersburg. On November 18, 1947, it was extended from the Hale-Lamb county line to Spade, closing the last gap. The route now matched the entire route of SH 278. On December 16, 1948, it extended west  miles from SH 214. On July 14, 1949, it was extended west to the New Mexico State Line, completing its current route.

FM 55

Farm to Market Road 55 (FM 55) is located in Ellis and Navarro counties. It runs from US 77 near Waxahachie and runs to FM 709 south of Purdon.

FM 55 was designated on May 19, 1942, from SH 31 to Purdon. On July 27, 1948, FM 55 was extended to SH 22, replacing FM 634. On November 28, 1958, FM 55 was extended to the Navarro-Ellis County Line, replacing FM 1782. On May 2, 1962, FM 55 was extended north to SH 34. On June 1, 1962, FM 55 was extended north to US 77, replacing FM 1492. On May 7, 1974, FM 55 was extended south to FM 709, completing its current route.

FM 56

Farm to Market Road 56 (FM 56) is located in Bosque, Somervell, and Hood counties.

FM 56 was designated on May 19, 1942, from SH 317 & US 84 in McGregor north to Crawford. Soon after that, FM 56 was extended north to SH 67 (this section became part of SH 6 on September 26, 1945) Valley Mills. On June 11, 1945, FM 56 was extended north to Cayote (also called Coyote). On October 29, 1947, the section of FM 56 from Valley Mills to McGregor was transferred to SH 317, shortening FM 56 to be a route from Valley Mills to Cayote. On July 14, 1949, FM 56 was extended north to SH 22. On October 26, 1954, FM 56 was extended north to FM 1859 in Kopperl, and a section of FM 1859 from Kopperl to SH 174 was transferred to FM 56. On October 31, 1957, FM 56 was extended northward to the end of FM 1992 at Brazos Point. On January 15, 1960, FM 56 was extended to SH 144, replacing all of FM 1992 and part of FM 202 north of what was then FM 1992. On December 20, 1984, when the district combined several farm to market roads with others, FM 56 was extended to a county road northwest of US 377, replacing FM 201.

FM 57

Farm to Market Road 57 (FM 57) is located in Jones and Fisher counties. It runs from Hamlin to FM 419.

FM 57 was designated on May 19, 1942, from Hamlin southwest to the Fisher County line. On May 18, 1944, the road was extended to Sylvester. On December 16, 1948, a section from Sylvester to Longworth was added, and the road was extended to SH 70, replacing FM 609. On September 20, 1961, the road was extended to FM 419, bringing the highway to its final length.

FM 58

Farm to Market Road 58 (FM 58) is located in Angelina County. It runs from US 69 southeast of Lufkin to FM 1818.

On March 20, 1946, the road was extended south to a county road (current FM 1818). On May 23, 1951, FM 58 was extended west to US 59 at Diboll. The same day a 1.1 mile section of FM 58 was renumbered FM 1877. On August 11, 1966, the section from FM 1818 to US 59 was transferred to FM 1818, bringing the highway to its final length.

FM 59

Farm to Market Road 59 (FM 59) is located in Henderson and Anderson counties. The road is 18.6 miles long.

The road begins at an intersection with SH 19 in Athens. From there, it goes southwest, passing through Cross Roads. The southern terminus is at US 287 in Cayuga. FM 59 was designated on May 19, 1942, from SH 19 in Athens to Cross Roads. On June 11, 1945, it was extended to Cayuga. This was part of SH 212 before 1939.

FM 60

In Brazos County, it is also known as Raymond Stotzer Pkwy west of FM 2154 and University Drive east of FM 2154.

FM 60 was designated on May 20, 1942, from SH 6 (now a business route) to a point near the eastern bank of the Brazos River, replacing a portion of SH 230. On August 24, 1943, a second section was created from FM 50 4 miles east of Snook east to the State Experimental Sub Station, creating a gap. On October 6 in that year, the western section was extended to SH 36 near Lyons, replacing a section of FM 50. On August 1, 1944, FM 60 was extended from a point near the eastern bank of the Brazos River to the State Experimental Sub Station, closing the gap. On October 31, 1957, it was extended east to FM 158. On December 15, 1960, the section from SH 6 (now a business route) to FM 158 was transferred to SH 30. On June 2, 1967, FM 60 was extended southwest  from SH 36. On February 29, 1968, FM 60 was extended from the old location of SH 6 to the new location of SH 6. On November 26, 1969, FM 60 was extended northwest  to FM 111. On December 19, 1969, FM 60 was extended northwest to SH 21, replacing FM 111. FM 111 was instead reassigned to an extension of its former spur connection, then numbered FM 2618. On May 23, 1978, it was extended northeast from SH 6 to FM 158. On June 27, 1995, the section from SH 47 to FM 158 was redesignated Urban Road 60 (UR 60). The designation reverted to FM 60 with the elimination of the Urban Road system on November 15, 2018.

FM 61

Farm to Market Road 61 (FM 61) runs from US 380 just south of Newcastle southeastward through Fort Belknap to SH 67 in Graham.

FM 61 was designated on June 23, 1942, from SH 24 (now US 380) in Graham, northward to Loving. On June 18, 1945, it was extended north to the Archer County Line. Seven days later, it was extended north to US 281. On November 21, 1956, FM 61 was extended west  from SH 24. On November 24, 1959, it extended west to SH 251 in Fort Belknap. On January 31, 1969, the section of FM 61 from US 380 in Graham northward to US 281 was transferred to SH 16. On May 6, 1974, one section in Graham was transferred to relocated SH 67. On February 23, 1993, it was extended north to US 380 south of Newcastle, replacing a section of SH 251 and completing its current route.

FM 62

Farm to Market Road 62 (FM 62) is located in Polk County. It runs from US 59 in Camden to US 287.

FM 62 was designated on June 23, 1942, from US 59 to Camden. On May 23, 1951, it was extended to Hortense. On July 27, 1951, the road from Camden to Hortense was redesignated as FM 646 (FM 646 was short-lived, as it became part of FM 942 on January 14, 1952), truncating FM 62 back to its previous terminus at Camden. On May 2, 1962, FM 62 was extended east to US 287.

FM 63

Farm to Market Road 63 (FM 63) was located in Live Oak and McMullen counties.

FM 63 was formed from a section of SH 72 on June 23, 1942, beginning at Three Rivers and ending near Calliham. On July 9, 1945, it was extended to Tilden. On May 22, 1947, it was extended to Fowlerton. FM 63 was cancelled on December 15, 1960, and transferred back to SH 72.

FM 64

Farm to Market Road 64 (FM 64) is a  road, located in Fannin and Delta counties, that begins at  SH 34 in Ladonia and passes through Pecan Gap and Antioch before ending at  Bus. SH 24 in Cooper. The road also has major intersections with  SH 24 in Cooper and several other Farm to Market Roads. FM 64 was designated in 1942, replacing SH 247.

FM 64 begins at SH 34 on the northern edge of Ladonia in Fannin County. The road proceeds to the east away from town and is joined from the north by  FM 904 before the combined route enters Pecan Gap and Delta County. On the west side of Pecan Gap, FM 904 separates turning to the south. On the east side of town at the intersection with  FM 128, FM 64 turns to the south and continues away from town.

At the intersection with FM 1532, FM 64 turns to the east. The road intersects  FM 1528 from the south, then  FM 3388 and  FM 1530 to the north before entering Cooper from the northwest. The road then intersects SH 24 which bypasses central Cooper on the northwest, and ends at the state highway's business route through town.

The road encounters terrain of gentle relief for its entire length.

FM 64 was designated as an extension of SH 154 on February 8, 1933. This section of SH 154 was decommissioned on July 15, 1935, but was restored on December 22, 1936. On August 4, 1937, SH 154 was rerouted over old SH 247, and this section was redesignated as new SH 247. The highway was described until June 23, 1942, as a route from Ladonia through Cooper to a point on SH 154 near the South Sulphur River. On November 23, 1948, the portion of the current road between SH 34 in Ladonia and Pecan Gap was added to FM 128 as an extension. The portion of FM 128 between Ladonia and Pecan Gap was reassigned as an extension to FM 64 on February 26, 1949. This extended FM 64 along the entire length of the former SH 247.

SH 154 north of Sulphur Springs was reassigned as part of SH 19 on August 24, 1960, but was extended over SH 19 and FM 64 to SH 24 in Cooper on August 28 of the following year terminating FM 64 at SH 24. In 1968, SH 24 in Cooper was relocated over its present bypass, and its original route through town where FM 64 ends was signed as its business route. From 1971 to 2003, SH 34 where FM 64 begins was also part of  SH 50.

FM 65

Farm to Market Road 65 (FM 65) is located in Zavala and Dimmit counties. It runs from US 83 south of Crystal City to I-35.

FM 65 was designated on June 23, 1942, from US 83 south of Crystal City to SH 85 west of Big Wells. On September 14, 1944, FM 65 was modified to end at US 83 north of Crystal City. On February 25, 2010, FM 65 was extended concurrent with SH 85 to I-35.

FM 66

Farm to Market Road 66 (FM 66) is located in Ellis and Hill counties. It runs from Mayfield to Waxahachie.

FM 66 was designated on June 23, 1942, from Itasca to Files Valley. This was designated as SH 325 from December 7, 1939, to February 20, 1940. On August 2, 1943, the road was extended to FM 74 at Maypearl. On August 23 of that year, the road was extended to Waxahachie, replacing FM 74. The final change was on June 18, 1945, when the road was extended to Mayfield.

FM 67

Farm to Market Road 67 (FM 67) is located in Hill County. It runs from FM 933 in Blum to FM 66 at Elm Street in Itasca.

FM 67 was designated on June 23, 1942, from SH 171 at Covington to Blum. On March 26, 1953, FM 67 was extended east 0.2 mile to new location SH 171. On October 27, 1956, FM 67 was extended north to SH 174, replacing Spur 248. On October 31, 1958, FM 67 was extended to FM 712 and US 81. On November 26, 1958, FM 67 was extended to FM 66 in Itasca, replacing FM 712. On July 21, 1961, the section north of FM 933 was transferred to FM 933. On March 26, 1991, the section of FM 67 along Files Street and Wilkerson Street was given to the city of Itasca.

FM 68

Farm to Market Road 68 (FM 68) is located within Fannin County. The road was designated on August 1, 1942, from a point on SH 78 north of Bailey through Gomer to a point on SH 34 at or near Whatley School as a replacement for SH 337.

FM 69

Farm to Market Road 69 (FM 69) is located in Hopkins and Wood counties. It runs from 2 miles north of FM 71 south to SH 37.

FM 69 was designated on September 22, 1942, from SH 37 south of Winnsboro west to Coke. On June 11, 1945, FM 69 was extended south back to SH 37. On November 21, 1956, FM 69 was extended east to SH 11.

FM 70

Farm to Market Road 70 (FM 70) is located in Jim Wells and Nueces counties.  It runs from US 59 to SH 286 in Chapman Ranch.

FM 70 was designated on May 23, 1951, from SH 286 in Chapman Ranch to SH 44 in Agua Dulce. On November 20, 1951, FM 70 was extended north to the Nueces-Jim Wells county line. On December 18, 1951, FM 70 was extended northeast to FM 739 and County Road 103. On January 14, 1952, FM 70 was extended northwest to US 59, replacing FM 739.

FM 70 (1942)

The original FM 70 was designated on September 22, 1942, from Crews via Winters to Wingate. FM 70 was cancelled on June 22, 1944, and became a portion of FM 53 (now SH 153).

FM 71

Farm to Market Road 71 (FM 71) is located in Hunt, Delta, Hopkins, Franklin, Titus, and Morris counties. It runs from SH 11 in Commerce to US 259.
FM 71 was designated on November 24, 1942, from SH 154 (now SH 19) east to Sulphur Bluff. This was formerly SH 260 before 1939. On June 11, 1945, FM 71 was extended east via Hagansport and Talco to Wilkinson. On November 23, 1948, FM 71 was extended west to Emblem with a spur connection to Peerless added, replacing FM 276 (which went from SH 154 to Peerless). On May 23, 1951, FM 71 was extended south to SH 11 at Ridgeway. On October 13, 1954, FM 71 was extended east to the Titus-Morris county line. On August 24, 1955, FM 71 was extended east to SH 26 (now US 259). On October 31, 1958, FM 71 was extended south from SH 11 to US 67 at Brashear. On September 27, 1960, the section south of Emblem was renumbered FM 2653, and FM 71 was rerouted west on a new alignment to FM 1531, and replaced a section of FM 1531 west to SH 11 in Commerce (later Loop 216, later Business SH 24-B, now Business SH 224-B).

FM 72

Farm to Market Road 72 (FM 72) runs from a point 1.8 miles north of Mertzon, runs east and ends at Sherwood. It was designated on February 12, 1943, on its current route.

FM 73

Farm to Market Road 73 (FM 73) is located in Limestone County. It runs from 3.1 miles northeast of SH 171 to US 84.

FM 73 was designated on February 12, 1943, from US 84 west of Prairie Hill to SH 171 in Coolidge. On May 5, 1966, FM 73 was extended northeast . On October 3, 1966, FM 73 had a slight rerouting because of the relocation of SH 171 in Coolidge.

FM 74

Farm to Market Road 74 (FM 74) is located within Cass County. It was designated on May 23, 1951, from Loop 236 at Queen City east to FM 251, and from another point on FM 251 to FM 249 in Bloomburg.

FM 74 (1943)

The original FM 74 was designated on March 8, 1943, from Waxahachie to Maypearl. The road was cancelled on August 23, 1943, and became part of FM 66.

FM 75

Farm to Market Road 75 (FM 75) is located within Collin County. The road begins at Monte Carlo Road in Princeton and runs north to FM 1827.

FM 75 was formed on April 15, 1943, from SH 24 (now US 380) along the former route of SH 145 to an intersection with former SH 24 as a replacement for State Spur 73. On November 24, 1959, the road was extended to FM 1827. On November 15, 1977, the southern terminus was redesignated as US 380. On February 28, 2019, the section of FM 75 from Monte Carlo Road to US 380 via Longneck Road, College Avenue, 2nd Street, McKinney Avenue, 3rd Street, Main Street, and 4th Street was given to the city of Princeton.

FM 76

Farm to Market Road 76 (FM 76) is located within El Paso County. The road begins at SH 20 in the Ascarate district of El Paso and heads southeastward to Clint, passing Loop 375 in the process. The highway then intersects with FM 1281, and remains parallel to I-10. Once it reaches Fabens, the highway turns southwest and then southeast and ends at FM 3380 (former FM 1109) near the Mexican border. At designation on April 14, 1943, the road went from US 80 in Ascarate to a point near Ysleta. The highway was expanded on May 18, 1944, from Ysleta to Clint, and then again on July 9, 1945, from Clint to Fabens. On December 16, 1948, the road was expanded to a junction of FM 1109. On April 2, 1969, the highway was slightly modified due to the portion of US 80 being modified into SH 20. On June 27, 1995, the section of the highway from FM 1110 to SH 20 was redesignated Urban Road 76 (UR 76). The designation reverted to FM 76 with the elimination of the Urban Road system on November 15, 2018.

FM 77

Farm to Market Road 77 (FM 77) is located within Gonzales County. The road begins at US 87 east of Nixon, then runs northeast to Schoolland and then southeast to FM 108.

FM 77 was designated on August 2, 1943, from US 87 east of Nixon northeast to Schoolland. On July 14, 1949, the road was extended to FM 108.

FM 78

Farm to Market Road 78 (FM 78) is located in Bexar and Guadalupe counties, connecting San Antonio and Seguin.

FM 79

Farm to Market Road 79 (FM 79) is located in Fannin and Lamar counties. It runs from FM 100 to US 82.

FM 79 was designated on August 3, 1943, from US 82 northwest to Unity. On August 25, 1949, it was extended  to the Fannin County Line. On December 18, 1951, FM 79 was extended to its current terminus at FM 100.

FM 80

Farm to Market Road 80 (FM 80) is located in Freestone and Limestone counties. It runs from FM 39 to SH 75 in Streetman.

FM 80 was designated on August 3, 1943, from US 84 (later Loop 255, now Business US 84) in Teague to SH 164 in Donie. On June 11, 1945, FM 80 was extended north to Kirvin. On July 15, 1948, Spur 156, connecting FM 80 to the Woodland Memorial Cemetery, became part of FM 80, and the old route became a spur connection. On July 21, 1949, FM 80 was extended south  from Donie. That same day, the spur became part of FM 1449. On July 25, 1950, FM 80 was extended south to FM 39. On November 16, 1956, the section from Kirvin to the Woodland Memorial Cemetery became part of new FM 1449, while old FM 1449 from Kirvin to US 75 (now SH 75) in Streetman became part of FM 80. 

FM 81

Farm to Market Road 81 (FM 81) is located in Karnes and Goliad counties. It runs from FM 1144 north, east, and south to SH 239 at Charco.

FM 81 was designated on August 23, 1943, from SH 239 at Charco to SH 72 at Runge. On July 9, 1945, FM 81 was extended to SH 80 at Helena.

FM 82

Farm to Market Road 82 (FM 82) is located in Newton and Jasper counties. It runs from FM 1004 west of US 87 to 4.5 miles west of US 96.

FM 82 was designated on May 23, 1951, from FM 1004 near SH 87 northwest  to a road intersection. On November 20, 1951, FM 82 was extended west to US 96. On June 1, 1965, FM 82 was extended west  to its current end.

FM 82 (1943)

The original FM 82 was designated on September 6, 1943, from Bonham via Randolph to Trenton. The section from Randolph to Bonham was formerly SH 263. FM 82 became a portion of SH 121 on December 16, 1943.

FM 83

Farm to Market Road 83 (FM 83) is located in San Augustine and Sabine counties. It connects SH 147 to Lows Creek Marina west of the Louisiana border.

FM 83 was designated on September 7, 1943, from Hemphill to East Mayfield. On June 11, 1945, it extended west to US 96 near Pineland. On May 3, 1961, FM 83 was extended west to SH 147 and east to a road intersection, replacing FM 2379 and FM 1965. On July 1, 1964, FM 83 was rerouted to use Flag Pole Road instead of Maple Street from US 96 to FM 1. On June 2, 1967, FM 83 was extended east . On September 26, 1979, FM 83 was extended east  to Lows Creek Marina.

FM 84

Farm to Market Road 84 (FM 84) is located in Grayson County. The  route connects US 75 to Lake Texoma.

FM 84 was designated on October 6, 1943, replacing a portion of SH 91. On June 27, 1995, the route was redesignated Urban Road 84 (UR 84). The designation reverted to FM 84 with the elimination of the Urban Road system on November 15, 2018.

Junction list

FM 85

Farm to Market Road 85 (FM 85) is located in Ellis, Navarro, and Henderson counties. It runs from I-45 and US 287 in Ennis to SH 274.

FM 85 was designated on October 6, 1943, from Mabank to SH 274. On June 28, 1945, a section from SH 198 to Prairieville was added, creating a concurrency with SH 198. On July 14, 1949, a section from FM 47 to Prairieville and a second section from SH 274 west  to west of Aley were added. On November 20, 1951, the road was extended westward and northward to the Kaufman/Henderson County line. On October 31, 1957, the road was extended northward to FM 988 at Lively. On October 30, 1961, the road was rerouted to run from US 75 (now I-45) to US 175: the section of FM 85 from FM 47 south to SH 198 was transferred to FM 90, the section of FM 85 from US 175 at Mabank south to then-FM 1250 was also transferred to FM 90, the section from then-FM 1129 north to then-FM 988 (which became part of FM 148 that day) was transferred to FM 2613, FM 662 was combined, the section of FM 1129 from then-FM 662 to then-FM 85 was transferred to FM 85, and FM 1250 was combined. On January 1, 1978, the section from I-45 south of Ennis northeast  was redesignated FM 3413, while FM 85 was rerouted over the old route of FM 3413. On December 14, 1989, the section from SH 274 to US 175 was transferred to SH 334, bringing the highway to its final length.

FM 86

Farm to Market Road 86 (FM 86) is located in Caldwell and Bastrop counties.

FM 86 begins at the intersection of  US 183 and  FM 2984 in northern Luling. The route travels primarily to the northeast through unincorporated Caldwell County. It ends just north of the Bastrop County line, at an intersection with  FM 20 near Red Rock, in the community of Bateman.

FM 86 was designated on August 24, 1943, replacing the entirety of State Highway 311. At the time SH 311 was designated, the section of FM 20 north of Lockhart was part of Texas State Highway 21.

FM 87

Farm to Market Road 87 (FM 87) is located in Fannin County. It runs from US 82 near Bonham to SH 56.

FM 87 was designated on March 24, 1993, from US 82 west of Bonham north  to a county road intersection. On August 25, 1994, the road was extended north  to a prison facility and a second proposed prison facility (the TDC Choice Moore Unit and Buster Cole State Jail). On June 26, 2008, the road was extended north to US 82.

FM 87 (1943)

Ranch to Market Road 87 (RM 87) was designated on October 6, 1943, from Andrews west . On July 16, 1945, the road was extended east from Andrews to the Martin County line. The same day the road was extended east to SH 137 near Lenorah, and also on the same day the road was extended east to the Howard County line. On August 22, 1945, the road was extended west to the Texas/New Mexico state line. On May 25, 1946, the designation was changed from RM to FM. On January 22, 1947, the road was extended east to Big Spring. Parts were SH 262 before 1939. On September 23, 1953, FM 87 was signed (but not designated) as SH 176. FM 87 was cancelled on August 29, 1990, as the SH 176 designation became official.

FM 88

Farm to Market Road 88 (FM 88) is located in Willacy and Hidalgo counties. It runs from SH 186 south to US 281 west of Progresso.

FM 88 was designated on November 15, 1943, from SH 186 south to SH 107 in Elsa. FM 88 was the first farm-to-market route designated in Hidalgo County. On May 18, 1944, FM 88 was extended south via Weslaco (where it intersects US 83) to US 281 in Progresso. On September 22, 1953, FM 88 was extended south to the Rio Grande, replacing FM 2067. On October 24, 1963, the section of FM 88 south of US 281 was transferred to FM 1015. On June 27, 1995, the section from US 83 to US 281 was redesignated Urban Road 88 (UR 88). The designation of this section reverted to FM 88 with the elimination of the Urban Road system on November 15, 2018.

FM 89

Farm to Market Road 89 (FM 89) is located in Taylor County. It runs from FM 126 near Nolan to US 83/US 84 in Abilene.

FM 89 starts just east of the Nolan–Taylor county line. The highway straddles the Callahan Divide, surrounded by wind turbines. At Abilene State Park, the terrain becomes flatter, as the road comes into Buffalo Gap. When coming into Buffalo Gap, FM 89 winds through town then continues northward toward Abilene. Upon entering the Wylie portion of Abilene, FM 89 becomes locally known as Buffalo Gap Road, and continues with this designation past the Mall of Abilene to the Winters Freeway, where FM 89 ends. Buffalo Gap Road continues northward.

FM 89 was designated on December 16, 1943, from US 83/84 to Lake Abilene State Park. On November 10, 1947, the section from Abilene to Buffalo Gap was transferred to FM 613. On June 17, 1965, FM 89 regained its lost section, replacing a section of FM 613, but signage was not changed until January 1, 1966. On May 5, 1966, FM 89 was extended west . On June 2, 1967, it extended northwestward . On July 11, 1968, it was extended west to US 277 and FM 2928. On August 2, 1968, it was extended west to FM 126, replacing FM 2928. On June 27, 1995, the section from FM 707 to US 83/US 84 was redesignated Urban Road 89 (UR 89). The designation of this section reverted to FM 89 with the elimination of the Urban Road system on November 15, 2018.

In January 2022, construction began to upgrade a  section of FM 89 in Abilene. Plans to improve the roadway had been included as part of the city's transportation plan as early as 1995 and were necessitated by increased development in the southern part of the city. The project is scheduled to be completed in March 2024.

FM 90

Farm to Market Road 90 (FM 90) is a  route located in Kaufman and Van Zandt counties.

The road begins at an intersection with SH 198 in Mabank, and heads north towards Prairieville.  North of there, the road turns northeast to its northern terminus, an intersection with FM 47/FM 3227 near Whitton.

FM 90 was formed on March 30, 1944, from SH 31 in Malakoff to Cross Roads. On October 30, 1961, FM 90 replaced a section of FM 316 from SH 31 to its current southern terminus. FM 90 also replaced FM 1617 from FM 316 to FM 85 (now SH 334). It also replaced a section of FM 85 from FM 47 to what was then FM 1617. On May 19, 1983, the section from Mabank to Malakoff was transferred to SH 198 and the section from Malakoff to Cross Roads was renumbered as FM 3441.

FM 91

Farm to Market Road 91 (FM 91) is located in Hardeman and Wilbarger counties. It runs from FM 1167 near Medicine Mound to US 283.

FM 91 was designated on February 11, 1944, from US 287 in Chillicothe via Odell to US 283. On July 15, 1949, the highway extended south  with a spur connection west  added. On October 26, 1954, FM 91 was rerouted over the spur connection and was extended to FM 1167 at Medicine Mound, while the old route south was renumbered FM 392. On April 29, 1959, a spur connection in Medicine Mound was added.

FM 92

Farm to Market Road 92 (FM 92) is located in Tyler and Hardin counties. It runs from US 96 at Silsbee to 2.2 miles north of US 190.

FM 92 was designated on February 11, 1944, from US 96 (this section became Loop 498 on November 30, 1978, and it is now Business US 96-F) in Silsbee northward to US 190. On May 7, 1970, FM 92 was extended north  from US 190. On August 28, 1991, FM 92 was extended north to RE 255, completing its current route. However, this extension is not yet constructed.

Town Bluff, one of the earliest settlements in Tyler County, is located along FM 92.

The road is mentioned in the ZZ Top song "Avalon Hideaway" on the album Tejas''.

FM 93

Farm to Market Road 93 (FM 93) is located in Bell County. It runs from FM 439 to US 190 at Heidenheimer.

FM 93 was designated on June 2, 1967, from FM 817 east to I-35. On January 31, 1974, the road was extended east to US 190 at Heidenheimer and west to FM 439, replacing all of FM 2748 west of SH 317, a section of FM 817, a section of FM 1741 (new road built; old road is now Taylors Valley Road), and all of FM 2618, but signing of FM 2618 as FM 93 did not start until the construction of FM 2618 was completed. On June 27, 1995, the section between FM 439 and FM 1741 was redesignated Urban Road 93 (UR 93). The designation of this section reverted to FM 93 with the elimination of the Urban Road system on November 15, 2018.
Junction list

RM 93 (1944)

RM 93 was designated on February 11, 1944, from US 290 at or near Austin to US 281 south of Marble Falls. On September 28, 1949, RM 93 was extended northwest to SH 16. On October 24, 1955, RM 93 was signed, but not designated, as an extension of SH 71. RM 93 was cancelled on September 1, 1965, and officially transferred to SH 71, as SH 71 officially extended further west to Brady.

FM 94

Farm to Market Road 94 (FM 94) is located in the Texas Panhandle. It runs from US 62/US 83 south of Childress to SH 70 in Matador. A spur connection, FM Spur 94, connects to US 62/US 70 in Matador.

FM 94 was designated on February 11, 1944, from Childress west to Tell. On March 18, 1947, a section of War Highway 16 (which was already part of FM 94) from US 83 west 1.75 miles was added to FM 94, and FM 94 was extended to US 287 in Childress, replacing Loop 146. On November 21, 1956, the road was extended southwest  to US 70 in Matador. On December 14, 1959, the section of FM 94 north of FM 2042 was transferred to FM 2042, and FM 94 was rerouted over the old route of FM 2042. One section of FM 2042 was transferred to FM 164 on September 5, 1973, and another section north to FM 164 was transferred to FM 3468 on August 4, 1988. On January 2, 1962, FM Spur 94, connecting to SH 70 in Matador, was added. On September 24, 2007, by district request, FM 94 was routed over FM Spur 94 to SH 70 while FM Spur 94 was rerouted over the former route of FM 94 to US 62/US 70. On October 25, 2012, the road was realigned on a new route west of FM 2042; the former route was turned over to Childress County.

FM 95

Farm to Market Road 95 (FM 95) is located in Rusk and Nacogdoches counties. It runs from FM 1798 in Minden south to SH 103.

FM 95 was designated on May 18, 1944, from US 59 in Garrison to the Nacogdoches-Rusk county line. On May 7, 1948, FM 95 was extended northwest to SH 26 (now US 259) west of Minden. On November 20, 1951, FM 95 was extended southwest to FM 225. On December 10, 1951, FM 95 was extended northwest to FM 839, replacing FM 1716. On January 27, 1953, the section west of FM 1798 was transferred to FM 1798. On June 18, 1964, FM 95 was extended south to SH 103, replacing FM 1274. Part of what was FM 1274 was originally numbered FM 1863.

FM 96

Farm to Market Road 96 (FM 96) is located in Cass County. It runs from SH 77 north and southeast to US 59.

FM 96 was designated on May 23, 1951, from SH 77 northward  to Antioch. On January 23, 1953, FM 96 was extended north and southeast to US 59.

FM 96 (1944)

The original FM 96 was designated on April 19, 1944, from Gorman to Desdemona in Eastland County. FM 96 was cancelled on May 17, 1948, and became a portion of FM 8.

FM 97

Farm to Market Road 97 (FM 97) is located in Floyd and Motley counties. It runs from SH 70 west to US 70 in Lockney.

FM 97 was designated on May 18, 1944, from SH 18 (now SH 70) westward to Flomot. On June 11, 1945, FM 97 was extended west to the Motley-Floyd County Line. On December 2, 1953, FM 97 was extended west to SH 207, replacing FM 785. On March 24, 1958, FM 97 was extended west and south to Loop 75 in Lockney, replacing FM 135 (although it remained signed as FM 135 until the 1959 travel map was released). Later, FM 97 was rerouted west to US 70, with the old route to Loop 75 being redesignated as a spur connection. On January 20, 1964, the spur connection to Lockney was cancelled because it was already part of FM 378 (which had extended north from what is now FM 37 on December 21, 1959).

FM 98

Farm to Market Road 98 (FM 98) is located in Foard and Wilbarger counties. It runs from SH 6 near Crowell northeast to US 70

FM 98 was designated on May 18, 1944, from US 70 in Crowell northeast to Margaret. On October 28, 1953, FM 98 was extended east  from Margaret. On September 21, 1955, FM 98 was extended east to FM 2183. On November 1, 1955, FM 98 was extended east to US 70, replacing FM 2183. On September 29, 1977, FM 98 was extended south and west to SH 6.

FM 99

Farm to Market Road 99 (FM 99) is located in Karnes, Atascosa, Live Oak, and McMullen counties. It runs from FM 1144 in Karnes City to a road intersection 4 miles south of SH 72.

FM 99 was designated on April 19, 1944, from Karnes City to the Karnes-Atascosa county line. On May 15, 1946, FM 99 was extended west to Fashing. On October 23, 1948, another section from US 281 (now Business US 281) at Whitsett north to the Live Oak-Atascosa County Line was added, creating a gap. On September 19, 1951, the sections were connected, closing the gap. On October 28, 1953, FM 99 was extended southwest to the Live Oak-McMullen County Line. On October 27, 1954, FM 99 was extended south to FM 63 (which became part of SH 72 on December 15, 1960) in Calliham, replacing FM 2153. On March 27, 1981, a section of FM 99 was closed as it would be inundated by Choke Canyon Reservoir, so FM 99 was rerouted on a new alignment west and extended south to a road intersection  miles south of SH 72, replacing FM 1106. SH 72 was also rerouted around the reservoir.

Notes

References

+00
Farm to market roads 0001
Farm to Market Roads 0001